Leslie Snow may refer to:

Leslie Perkins Snow (1862–1934), Justice of the New Hampshire Supreme Court
Leslie Snow (athlete) (1907-1995), English athlete who competed in the javelin at the 1930 British Empire Games